Ismael Romero Fernández (born June 23, 1991) is a Cuban-born Puerto Rican professional basketball player for Libertadores de Querétaro of the LNBP and the Puerto Rican national team. Romero formerly represented the Cuban national team. He played college basketball for Universidad del Turabo from Puerto Rico.

College career
After leaving Cuba, Romero attended the Universidad del Turabo of Puerto Rico where he helped his team to win, undefeated, the Liga Atlética Interuniversitaria de Puerto Rico (LAI) in 2014.

Professional career
In 2007, Romero joined local team Villa Clara, where he played for four seasons. On October 31, he was selected by the Grand Rapids Drive in the fourth round of the 2015 NBA Development League Draft. On January 28, 2016, he made his D-League debut in a 90–87 win over the Iowa Energy, recording one point and one rebound in seven minutes. On March 20, 2016, Romero had a double-double in a 102–97 win over the Fort Wayne Mad Ants, finishing with 13 points, 14 rebounds and three steals, including nine points in the fourth quarter. In 27 games, he averaged 5.4 points and 4.9 rebounds per game.

On April 6, 2016, Romero signed with Atléticos de San Germán of the Puerto Rican League. The next day, he made his debut for San Germán in a 90–75 loss to Vaqueros de Bayamón, recording 11 points, three rebounds, three assists and one steal in 17 minutes. On May 26, he was named the BSN Rookie of the Year. In 17 games, he averaged 13.0 points, 5.1 rebounds, 1.4 assists and 1.2 steals in 24.1 minutes.

On August 30, 2016, Romero signed with Mexican team Panteras de Aguascalientes. In 24 games, he averaged 18.3 points, 8.0 rebounds, 1.2 assists and 0.8 steals in 23.8 minutes.

On January 4, 2017, Romero was reacquired by the Grand Rapids Drive. Two days later, he made his season debut for Grand Rapids in a 126–124 win over the Santa Cruz Warriors, recording six points, eight rebounds, one steal and two blocks in nine minutes off the bench. On April 1, 2017, Romero signed with  Atléticos de San Germán, returning to the team for a second stint.

On July 7, 2017, Romero signed with Hapoel Haifa B.C., Israeli basketball team that play in the Liga Leumit.

International career
When Romero was 19, he played with the Cuba national basketball team at the 2012 Centrobasket, playing in an 81–61 loss against Bahamas. That very night, Romero, along with four other players of the Cuban selection, abandoned the team and asked for political asylum in Puerto Rico.

On September 13, 2021, the Puerto Rican Basketball Federation announced that they had initiated the naturalization process with FIBA for Romero to be able to represent the Puerto Rican national basketball team. On October 5, 2021, FIBA authorized the request for Romero's naturalization making him eligible to represent Puerto Rico in future competitions.

Awards and accomplishments

Club
Vaqueros de Bayamón
 BSN champion: (2020 & 2022)
Quimsa
 BCL Americas: (2020)

Individual
 BSN Rookie of the Year: (2016)
 LSB Rookie of the Year: (2011)
 BCL Americas rebounding leader: (2022)

References

External links
 RealGM profile

1991 births
Living people
Atléticos de San Germán players
Cuban men's basketball players
Defecting sportspeople of Cuba
Hapoel Haifa B.C. players
Capitanes de Ciudad de México players
Grand Rapids Drive players
Power forwards (basketball)
People from Santa Clara, Cuba
Puerto Rican expatriate basketball people in Nicaragua
Small forwards
Real Estelí Baloncesto players
Puerto Rican expatriate basketball people in Israel
Puerto Rican expatriate basketball people in Mexico